Opequon Historic District is a national historic district located in Opequon near Winchester, Frederick County, Virginia. It encompasses 33 contributing buildings and 1 contributing site in the village of Opequon. Notable buildings include Race Mills (ca. 1751, ca. 1812 additions, 1950s restoration) the oldest surviving building in the village, the Glass-Rinker-Cooper Mill (c. 1812), Greenwood, The Millhouse (1738 or 1756), Homespun (1771), the Hodgson (Bayliss) Store (late 1800s), The Second Opequon Presbyterian Church (1939), Tokes' Inn (late 1800s), and Bleak House (Bageant House).

It was listed on the National Register of Historic Places in 2002.

References

External links
 

Historic districts on the National Register of Historic Places in Virginia
Buildings and structures in Frederick County, Virginia
National Register of Historic Places in Frederick County, Virginia